Bashaw is an unincorporated community in the town of Dewey, Burnett County, Wisconsin, United States.

References

Unincorporated communities in Burnett County, Wisconsin
Unincorporated communities in Wisconsin